Eléonor Marie du Maine (14 September 1655, Changy - 15 January 1739, Strasbourg), count of Le Bourg, baron of Espinasse was a French nobleman and general.

Life
He was made a page in the grande Écurie du roi in 1671, before joining the musketeers in 1673.  He then moved to the Gardes Françaises.  He fought his first campaigns in Franche-Comté, distinguishing himself in the 1674 attack on Besançon.  He also took part in the sieges of Condé, Bouchain (Nord), Valenciennes, Saint-Omer, Ypres, Kehl, and Strasbourg.

He became mestre de camp of the Régiment Royal Cavalerie in December 1701 and was made governor of the province of Alsace in 1713.  In 1724 he was made a Marshal of France.  His first wife's name is unknown — he married his second in Strasbourg on 14 January 1729, namely Marie Anne de Klinglin, elder sister of François-Joseph de Klinglin, "préteur royal" of Strasbourg, and of Christophe de Klinglin, first president of the Conseil souverain d'Alsace.

References

Sources

 Viton, Nicolas (1834). De l'ancienne France de Saint-Allais. p. Page 499.
 Revue d'Alsace n° 132 (2006). L'Alsace : un très riche patrimoine archéologique. Diplomatie et religion en Alsace au temps du cardinal de Fleury (1726-1743) pp. 129–173.

1655 births
1739 deaths
Barons of France
Counts of France
Marshals of France